Jan Augustyn (born 1962) is a Canadian curler from Hamilton, Ontario.

At the time of the 1986 World Championships, she worked as a teacher's aid in Burlington, Ontario, and was an avid lacrosse player.

Teams and events

References

External links
 
 Jan Augustyn – Curling Canada Stats Archive

1962 births
Living people
Canadian women curlers
Canadian women's curling champions
Curlers from Hamilton, Ontario
World curling champions
20th-century Canadian women